Andreas Georgiou (born Patras, 1960) is a Greek economist and former President of the Hellenic Statistical Authority (ELSTAT). In June 2021, he became the European Parliament’s representative at the European Statistical Governance Advisory Board, the body that provides an independent overview of the European Statistical System. Georgiou is a visiting lecturer and visiting scholar at Amherst College where he teaches statistical ethics and macroeconomics. He is also elected member of the Council of the International Statistical Institute and a member of the Committee on Professional Ethics of the American Statistical Association.

Biography 
Georgiou completed his secondary education in Athens College, and studied at Amherst College, where he received his Bachelor of Arts (Summa Cum Laude) in Economics and in Political Science-Sociology. He went on to receive his Ph.D. in Economics from the University of Michigan with specialization in monetary theory and stabilisation policy as well as in International Trade and Finance.

From 1989 to July 2010 he was staff of the International Monetary Fund (IMF). He has been head of missions, responsible for the preparation, negotiation, and monitoring of economic programs with IMF member countries. From March 2004 to July 2010 he was deputy division chief in the IMF Statistics Department. During that period, among other things, he led the work of the statistical program for the methodological development and dissemination of new indicators of stability of financial systems (Financial Soundness Indicators). He has taught economics at the University of Michigan and as a visiting professor at the University of Economics in Bratislava. In addition, he has conducted seminars and courses in statistical methodologies for IMF staff as well as state officials of more than 120 countries.

On 2 August 2010 he was appointed as President of the Hellenic Statistical Authority. On 2 August 2015, he surprisingly resigned from office with immediate effect.

In June 2021, the European Parliament elected Mr Georgiou near-unanimously to one of the seats on the seven-member European Statistical Governance Advisory Board (ESGAB).

In July 2016, the Greek Supreme Court upheld charges against Georgiou for having harmed the "national interest", with a possible sentence of up to 10 years in prison.

In June 2018, the Supreme Civil and Criminal Court of Greece ('Aeropagus') sentenced him to two years on probation for violation of duty for not submitting in November 2010 the revised 2009 deficit and debt statistics of Greece for approval before transmitting them to Eurostat. On 18 September 2018, during a Special Meeting on National Statistical Offices’ Professional Independence: Threats and Responses immediately prior to the XVI International Association for Official Statistics Conference in Paris, a special Commendation was awarded to Mr. Georgiou by six major international statistical organizations. This Commendation was given to "acknowledge Andreas Georgiou‘s upholding of the highest professional standards in his public service in the pursuit of integrity of statistical systems".  

Georgiou's prosecution has been denounced as a violation of scientific freedom and human rights by the American Statistical Association's Committee on Scientific Freedom and Human Rights and the editorial board of The Economist. The Financial Times reported, "The case has sparked outrage from economists and statisticians worldwide who believe Mr. Georgiou has become a scapegoat for Greece's political class."

See also 
 Greek debt crisis of 2010
 First Cabinet of Alexis Tsipras (26 January 2015 – 27 August 2015) 
 Judicial system of Greece

References 

1960 births
20th-century Greek economists
21st-century Greek economists
Living people
Greek government-debt crisis
People from Patras